Dr. Victor Urbancic or Viktor Ernest Johann von Urbantschitsch (9 August 1903 – 4 April 1958) was an Austrian composer, conductor, teacher and music scholar from Vienna. He emigrated to Iceland in 1938. His wife, Melitta, came from a Jewish family. Urbancic stayed for the second half of his life in Iceland and had a big influence on the music development in the country at the time.

Urbancic worked as teacher and director of the opera studio at the Conservatory of Graz before he came to Iceland in 1938. He also was lecturer of musicology of the University of Graz. In Iceland he was very important for the music-life. He became music director of the Icelandic National Theater in Reykjavík. He conducted the first opera in Iceland which was Rigoletto by Giuseppe Verdi in 1951. He taught at the Reykjavík College of Music. He was organist and choir director of the Landakotskirkja in Reykjavík. Urbancic died on Good Friday in 1958 in Reykjavík.

He is the grandson of Viktor Urbantschitsch through his father, Dr. Ernst Urbantschitsch, and related to Christoph Waltz through the later's mother Elisabeth Urbancic.

Selected works
 Caprices mignons for piano, Op. 1
 Sonatina in G major for piano, Op. 2
 Sonata No. 1 in F minor for violin and piano, Op. 3
 Sonata No. 2 for violin and piano, Op. 5
 Vier Lieder (4 Songs), Op. 6
 Partita for cello and piano, Op. 7
 Elizabeth for voice and piano, Op. 8
 Fantasie und Fuge for viola and piano, Op. 9 (1937)
 Orchesterkonzert (Concerto for Orchestra), Op. 11
 Fimm Þættir (5 Factors) for 2 trumpets, horn, 2 trombones and piano, Op. 12
 Concertino for 3 saxophones and string orchestra, Op. 13
 Ballade for violin and piano
 Gamanforleikur (Festive Prelude) in C major for orchestra
 Konzertrondo (Concert Rondo) for 2 pianos
 Mouvement de valse for piano
 Ouvertüre zu einer Komödie (Overture to a Comedy) for orchestra (1952)
 Sonata in G major for cello and piano

Notes 

1903 births
1958 deaths
Austrian male composers
Austrian composers
Male conductors (music)
Icelandic people of Austrian descent
20th-century Austrian conductors (music)
20th-century Austrian male musicians
20th-century Austrian composers